Hans Larsen (16 January 1873 – March 1952) was a British sports shooter. He competed in the team clay pigeon event at the 1924 Summer Olympics.

References

External links
 

1873 births
1952 deaths
British male sport shooters
Olympic shooters of Great Britain
Shooters at the 1924 Summer Olympics
People from Gladsaxe Municipality
20th-century British people